Sous Lieutenant Marcel Robert Leopold Bloch was a World War I flying ace who fought for the French on both Eastern and Western Fronts. He was credited with five aerial victories, all scored against German observation balloons.

World War I service
Bloch volunteered for the French military on 7 September 1916, and was assigned to aviation service. After pilot training, he was granted Military Pilot's Brevet No. 2571 on 12 October 1915.
Bloch was originally assigned to fly a Nieuport for Escadrille 3 but transferred to Escadrille 62 on 25 May 1916. He became a balloon buster ace, destroying five German observation balloons between 26 June and 1 October 1916. In the process of destroying number three, on 3 July 1916, he was seriously wounded twice. He downed his last two on 30 September and 1 October.

In 1917, Bloch was transferred from combat duty to a military mission. On 23 March, he was transferred to the Russian Front. He sustained serious injuries on 8 May 1917, when he suffered a flying accident. After many months in hospital, he was assigned to the French Mission to the United States on 10 September 1918.

Postwar life
On 1 March 1919, Bloch returned to France. He would never recover from his war wounds, succumbing to them 29 March 1938 in Czechoslovakia.

Honors and awards
Légion d'Honneur
Médaille Militaire
Croix de Guerre
Russian Order of Saint George
Russian Order of Saint Ann

References

Sources
 Franks, Norman; Bailey, Frank (1993). Over the Front: The Complete Record of the Fighter Aces and Units of the United States and French Air Services, 1914–1918. Grub Street Publishing. .
 Franks, Norman (2000). Nieuport Aces of World War 1. Osprey Publishing, 2000. , .

1890 births
1938 deaths
French World War I flying aces